Annasaheb Shankar Jolle (born 1963) is an Indian politician who is the current Member of Parliament in the Lok Sabha from Chikkodi.

Annasaheb Jolle and his wife Shashikala Jolle both contested on BJP tickets from Chikkodi-Sadalga and Nippani constituencies respectively. However, Annasaheb Jolle lost to Ganesh Hukkeri for the second time whereas Shashikala Jolle emerged victorious. Annasaheb Jolle later won Chikkodi Lok Sabha seat in 2019 Indian general election

References

External links
Official biographical sketch in Parliament of India website

India MPs 2019–present
Lok Sabha members from Karnataka
Living people
Bharatiya Janata Party politicians from Karnataka
People from Bidar
1964 births